The Quartz Lake Patrol Cabin in Glacier National Park is a significant resource both architecturally and historically as shelters, one-day's travel (8–12 miles) apart, for rangers patrolling the backcountry. The National Park Service Rustic log cabin was built in 1930 by local builder Austin Weikert, using National Park Service standard plan G913. The cabin is adjacent to the western shore of Quartz Lake.

References

Park buildings and structures on the National Register of Historic Places in Montana
Residential buildings completed in 1930
Log cabins in the United States
National Register of Historic Places in Flathead County, Montana
Log buildings and structures on the National Register of Historic Places in Montana
1930 establishments in Montana
National Register of Historic Places in Glacier National Park
National Park Service rustic in Montana